Hema may refer to:

 Hemā (mythology), a figure from Polynesian mythology
 HEMA (store), a Dutch chain of stores
 Hema (supermarket) (盒马), a supermarket chain in China
 Hema maps, an Australian map publisher
 Hema people, an ethnic group in the eastern Democratic Republic of the Congo
 Historical European martial arts
 (Hydroxyethyl)methacrylate, a monomer
 Marsa Alam International Airport (ICAO:HEMA)

People with the given name
 Hema (actress), a Tollywood character actress
 Hemalatha, Kollywood actress also credited as Hema
 Hema Malini, a Bollywood actress
 Hema Sardesai, an Indian playback singer from Goa

See also
 
 Hima (disambiguation)